Parmitieddi  (also known as Parmi or Parmatieddi) is a particular variety of cavatelli typical of Teggiano, a town in Campania. Parmitieddi are larger than cavatelli and flat-shaped. They are obtained by rolling a stick of dough with three fingers of one hand and are usually eaten as first course on Palm Sunday, served with ragù sauce and grated pecorino or ricotta salata cheese. Their shape similar to that of a tree leaf, would like to recall that of palm branches the crowd scattered in front of Jesus when he entered into Jerusalem.

See also
List of pasta

References

Types of pasta